This is a list of diseases and disorders found in potatoes.

Bacterial diseases

Fungal diseases

Protistan diseases

Viral and viroid diseases

Nematode parasitic

Phytoplasmal diseases

Miscellaneous diseases and disorders

References

 Common Names of Diseases, The American Phytopathological Society
 Potato Diseases (Fact Sheets and Information Bulletins), The Cornell Plant Pathology Vegetable Disease Web Page

External links
 

Potato